The Ministry for the Aegean was a government department of Greece. It was founded in 1985 (Law 1558/1985), with Mytilene as its seat, and tasked with supervising the development of the long-neglected Aegean Islands.

In 2007 it was merged with the Ministry for Mercantile Marine to form the Ministry for Mercantile Marine, the Aegean and Island Policy. The new ministry retained a Deputy Minister with seat at Mytilene. In 2009 the ministry was split up, with the Mercantile Marine sector being absorbed by the Ministry for the Economy, Competitiveness and Shipping and the former Ministry for the Aegean department merged into the Ministry of Infrastructure, Transport and Networks as the General Secretariat for the Aegean and Island Policy. In September 2010, the General Secretariat was absorbed by the Ministry for Maritime Affairs, Islands and Fisheries.

List of Ministers for the Aegean (1985–2007)

List of Ministers for Mercantile Marine, the Aegean and Island Policy (2007–2009)

See also
Cabinet of Greece

References

Defunct government ministries of Greece
Lists of government ministers of Greece
1985 establishments in Greece
Aegean Sea
Greece, Aegean
Andreas Papandreou